The  Industrial Development Bank of Turkey (TSKB) was Turkey’s first privately-owned investment and development bank and was established in 1950. Its headquarters are in Istanbul. It has been supported by the World Bank. In early 2023 its P/E ratio was around 10. In 2022 it was rated B by Fitch.

References

Investment banks
Turkey
1950 establishments